Another or variant may refer to:

 anOther or Another Magazine, a culture and fashion magazine
 Another (novel), a Japanese horror novel
 Another (film), a Japanese 2012 live-action film based on the novel
 Another (TV series), a Japanese 2012 animated series
 Another River, in the U.S. state of Alaska
 A. N. Other, a pseudonym

See also
 Yet another
 Indefinite pronoun
 English determiners
 Other (disambiguation)
 Others (disambiguation)